Ángel Abelardo González Bernardo (3 September 1944 – 5 May 2021) was a Spanish professional footballer who played as a goalkeeper.

Career
Born in Sotrondio, González played for El Entrego, Langreo, Valencia, Sporting Gijón and Quart. He was also a Spain under-23 international.

After retiring as a player he remained in Valencia, running several businesses.

Honours

Club 
Valencia

La Liga: 1970–71
Copa del Generalísimo: 1966–67

Individual 

Ricardo Zamora Trophy: 1970–71

References

1944 births
2021 deaths
Spanish footballers
UP Langreo footballers
Valencia CF players
Sporting de Gijón players
Segunda División players
la Liga players
Association football goalkeepers
Spain youth international footballers
Spanish businesspeople
People from San Martín del Rey Aurelio